London City may refer to:

Correctly
London City Airport, in east London, England
London City Airport DLR station
London City Soccer Club, in London, Ontario
London City Lionesses, English women's football team 
London City Royals, English basketball team, now defunct

Incorrectly, or at least unidiomatically
London, England
City of London, financial district of London 
London, Ontario, Canada
London City Council, governs London, Ontario